The Japanese red-backed vole, Wakayama red-backed vole, or Anderson's red-backed vole (Myodes andersoni) is a species of rodent in the family Cricetidae.
It is found only on the island of Honshu in Japan. It was first described by the British zoologist Oldfield Thomas in 1905. Thomas named it in honor of scientific collector Malcolm Playfair Anderson. The International Union for Conservation of Nature lists it as "least concern".

Distribution and habitat
The Japanese red-backed vole is endemic to the island of Honshu in Japan and occurs in the Chūbu region, the Hokuriku region and in the more northerly parts of the island, and also in the Kii Peninsula. It is mostly found at altitudes of over  but below the alpine zone. It typically occurs in rocky areas and around rivers, as well as in banks, dykes and stone walls in agricultural areas.

References

Musser, G. G. and M. D. Carleton. 2005. Superfamily Muroidea. pp. 894–1531 in Mammal Species of the World a Taxonomic and Geographic Reference. D. E. Wilson and D. M. Reeder eds. Johns Hopkins University Press, Baltimore.

Myodes
Mammals described in 1905
Taxa named by Oldfield Thomas
Endemic fauna of Japan
Mammals of Japan
Taxonomy articles created by Polbot